The North Carolina General Assembly of 2015–2016 was the state legislature that was first convened in Raleigh, North Carolina on January 14, 2015 and concluded in December 2016. This was the 151st meeting of the North Carolina General Assembly.  Members of the North Carolina Senate and the North Carolina House of Representatives were elected on November 4, 2014.  Republicans controlled the Senate and Democrats controlled the House of Representatives.

Legislation
The legislature passed 123 Session laws during regular sessions.  There were four additional sessions dealing with elections and redistricting in which six additional session laws were passed.  One particularly controversial session law was Senate Bill 2 (North Carolina General Assembly, 2015 Session) that dealt with an anti-LGBT law and allowed magistrates, assistant registers of deeds, and deputy registers of deeds to recuse themselves from performing duties related to marriage ceremonies due to sincerely held religious objection.

Pat McCrory was the Governor of North Carolina and Dan Forest was Lieutenant Governor of North Carolina and President of the Senate  during these sessions of the general assembly.  Both were Republicans.

House of Representatives

House Leadership

Members of the House
The House of Representatives consisted of members representing the 120 districts established from population numbers in the 2010 census.  The house members included 26 women, 22 African-Americans, and one Native American.  There were 74 Republicans, 45 Democrats and one Independent Representatives from the 120 districts in North Carolina.

The following table lists the districts and representatives:

Senate

Senate Leadership

Members of the Senate
The Senate consisted of 50 members including 13 female, 11 African-American, 34 Republican, 16 Democrat, 10 new, and 40 returning senators.  Fletcher L. Hartsell, Jr.  was the most senior senator with 13 terms in the Senate.

↑: Member was first appointed to office.

See also
 2014 North Carolina Senate election
 2014 United States House of Representatives elections in North Carolina

Notes

References

External links
 (current legislature)
Documents of the Senate, 2015-2016 Session
Documents of the House, 2015-2016 Session

2015
General Assembly
General Assembly
 2015
 2015
2015 U.S. legislative sessions
2016 U.S. legislative sessions